San Bernardo may refer to:

Places

Mexico
San Bernardo, Baja California Sur
San Bernardo, Chihuahua
San Bernardo, Coahuila
San Bernardo, Durango
San Bernardo, Guanajuato (3 towns)
San Bernardo, Hidalgo (2 towns)
San Bernardo Tlamimilolpan, Mexico State
San Bernardo, Oaxaca (2 towns)
San Bernardo Mixtepec, Oaxaca
San Bernardo, Nuevo León
San Bernardo, Puebla
San Bernardo, Sonora
San Bernardo, Tabasco
San Bernardo, Yucatán (2 towns)
San Bernardo, Zacatecas

Other countries
Tarija, Bolivia or San Bernardo de la Frontera de Tarija
San Bernardo, Chile
San Bernardo del Viento, Colombia
San Bernardo, Nariño, Colombia
San Bernardo, Cundinamarca, Colombia
Archipelago of San Bernardo, a group of islands in the Caribbean belonging to Colombia
San Bernardo del Tuyú, a city in Argentina

Other uses 
San Bernardo (Madrid Metro), a railway station in Madrid, Spain
San Bernardo alle Terme, a church in Italy
San Bernardo (Ringling, Oklahoma), on the NRHP in Jefferson County, Oklahoma
San Bernardo (1966 film), a Filipino film directed by Fernando Poe Jr.

See also
Bernard (disambiguation)
San Bernardino (disambiguation)
Saint Bernard (disambiguation)